Phillip Neal "Phil" Butler (born August 11, 1938) was the eighth-longest-held U.S. prisoner of war (POW) held in North Vietnam during the Vietnam War. Butler, a Navy pilot, who was forced to eject after a mid-air explosion on April 20, 1965 and served as a prisoner of war in North Vietnam until his release as part of Operation Homecoming in 1973. Butler was one of the five POW's (with Carlyle "Smitty" Harris, Hayden Lockhart, Robert Peel, and Robert H. Shumaker) credited with establishing the tap code. The code enabled the prisoners to communicate with each other. 

After his release Butler earned a PhD in sociology and used his communication skills to provide leadership training in military and civilian life. Butler provided community service as President of Veterans for Peace.  In October 2019 Butler was inducted into the Oklahoma Military Hall of Fame.

Early life 
Phillip Neal Butler was born on August 11, 1938 in Tulsa, Oklahoma. He attended Lanier Elementary School, Wilson Jr. High School and Will Rogers High School, from which he graduated in Tulsa, Oklahoma. He logged enough flying hours to receive a commercial pilots license two months after his high school graduation. Butler attended the University of Oklahoma with a Naval Reserve Officers Training Corps (NROTC) scholarship and then accepted an appointment to the U.S. Naval Academy at Annapolis.

Military career

Navy training and early career 
Phillip Butler graduated with a Bachelor of Science degree in 1961 from the U.S. Naval Academy.  Butler received his officer's commission and married Karen Olsen the day after graduation. On assignment in Texas, Butler flew the single-seated fighter airplane, Grumman F-11 Tiger, during the Cuban Missile Crisis.  Butler was assigned to Naval Air Station Lemoore in California.

Capture 

His mission was to fly from the Gulf of Tonkin  to Highway 1, the major transportation route that the North Vietnamese used to carry military supplies to their troops in the south. The bombing run was at night because that was when the North Vietnamese moved material. According to Butler's report his aircraft exploded due to a malfunction of the electrically-fused Mark-81 VT experimental fuses on the 250-lb bombs.

On the fourth day, the North Vietnamese, using dogs, were able to track him down and capture him. Butler went down near the North Vietnamese city of Vinh.

Butler was moved around to ten different prisons in North Vietnam over the next seven years and ten months.

Butler was first reported missing and then mistakenly reported killed in action. The erroneous news of his death was published in his home town of Tulsa, Oklahoma.

In 1965 Butler was placed in the same cell with Carlyle "Smitty" Harris, Lieutenant Robert Peel and Robert H. Shumaker. Harris taught the others a special code that he had learned at a survival training.  This tap code enabled the prisoners to communicate with quiet taps on the walls of the cells.

After the death of Ho Chi Minh in September 1969 the treatment of the US POWs improved.

After release 

After recovery from his injuries and a difficult divorce Butler attended graduate school while in the Navy.  Butler earned a Ph.D. in Sociology at UC San Diego and worked as a Navy Organizational Effectiveness consultant and a professor of management at the U.S. Naval Postgraduate School in Monterey, CA. Butler retired from the Navy as a Commander in 1981.

Medals 

 Butler was awarded 2 Silver Stars (Silver Star Medal with Gold Star indicating two awards), In part it read ..." for conspicuous gallantry and intrepidity while interned as a Prisoner of War In North Vietnam. During the period May to July 1967 Commander Butler's captors, completely ignoring international agreements, subjected him to extreme mental and physical cruelties in an attempt to obtain military information or false confessions for propaganda purposes...by his determination, courage, resourcefulness and devotion to duty Commander Butler reflected great credit upon himself and upheld the highest tradition of the Naval Service and the US Armed Forces."
 Butler was awarded a Bronze Star with Combat Distinguishing Device and a Gold Star indicating two awards
 Purple Heart with Gold Star indicating 2 awards
 Two Legion of Merit awards  "..for exceptionally meritorious conduct in the performance of outstanding services...while interned as a POW in North Vietnam..he performed duties involving highly classified material in an exemplary and professional manner. Through his zealousness and ingenuity, he generated new ideas and improvised techniques greatly enhancing covert operations.
 Navy Commendation Medal with Combat Distinguishing Device,
 Prisoner of War Medal.

Awards and honors 
 Inducted into the Oklahoma Military Hall of Fame 2019
 Awarded Veteran of the Year by the Monterey County Board of Supervisors October 23, 2018
 Baha'i Human Rights Award 2019 presented at the United Nations human rights day celebration

Civilian life

Business 

Butler had a consulting and management company, Camelot Enterprises 1981–2000, specializing in executive team building, interpersonal skills, planning, personal coaching and mentoring.

Personal 
Butler married Barbara Baldock in 1980 and moved to Monterey, California.

Veterans for Peace
Butler served as president of Veterans for Peace (1997–2000). Butler opposed the candidacy of fellow former POW John McCain in the 2008 US presidential campaign, supporting Barack Obama. He said that "John McCain is not somebody I would like to see with his finger near the red button".

Community service 
 Veterans for Peace chapter 46 of Monterey County
 Coalition of Homeless Services Providers
 Peace Coalition of Monterey County
 Point Lobos State Reserve, docent for 29 years
 Big Sur Land Trust Board member
 Board member and president Monterey County AIDS Project
 Board member The World Affairs Council of Monterey
 Board member and chair of National Veterans for Peace (president 1997–2000)
 Community Advisory Committee, California Department of Corrections, Soledad Prison / Training Facility
 President and Founder of the Management Institute of Monterey
 Ombudsman for Long Term Care
 Commissioner and Chair of the Community Action Council of Monterey county

Writings by Phillip Butler 
 From Nationalist to Humanist. The Humanist Magazine March/April 1986 Vol 46, pp 23–32
 AIDS awareness ; December 13, 1992. The Monterey County Herald guest editorial p 3A
 Why I volunteer June 1, 1996 Monterey Bay community Links
 No Tanks in Monterey 4 July Parade: War machines in city streets sends a wrong message June 27, 1999) Monterey County Herald
 On Torture from someone who knows. American Civil Liberties Union (ACLU) blog June 28, 2009
 Three Lives of a Warrior 2010 Camelot Press 
 Ex-Viet POW Phil Butler on "3 Lives of a Warrior" Peter B Collins show October 19, 2010 PBC broadcast.
 A Vietnam War POW takes America to task over its treatment of a Taliban POW. July 3, 2014. Monterey County Weekly.
 Prisoner Swap re Sgt. Bowe Bergdahl 20 July 2014 Monterey County Weekly
 A Gathering Storm  Veterans for Peace newsletter  January 5, 2017

Bibliography 
 
 
 
 
 
 
 
 
 Foster, Gary Wayne (2022)  The Hanoi March: American POWs in North Vietnam's Crucible ISBN 9781954163355, 1954163355.

References 

Vietnam War prisoners of war
United States Naval Aviators
United States Navy officers
Recipients of the Legion of Merit
United States Navy personnel of the Vietnam War
American torture victims
Living people
United States Naval Academy alumni
1938 births
Recipients of the Silver Star